Nimbus 5 (also called Nimbus E or Nimbus V) was a meteorological satellite for research and development of sensing technology. It was the fifth successful launch in a series of the Nimbus program.

The objective of Nimbus 5 was to test and evaluate advanced sensing technology, and to provide improved photographs of cloud formations.

Launch 
Nimbus 5 was launched on December 11, 1972, by a Delta rocket from Vandenberg Air Force Base, California, USA. The satellite orbited the Earth once every 107 minutes, at an inclination of 99°.

Instruments 
There were 6 science instruments aboard Nimbus 5. The satellite also included sun sensors, and horizon scanners for navigation.

Infrared Temperature Profile Radiometer (ITPR) 
The ITPR was designed to obtain vertical profiles of temperature and moisture in the atmosphere.

Selective Chopper Radiometer (SCR)
The SCR had three objectives; to observe the global atmospheric temperature structure, to observe the distribution of water vapor, and to measure the density of ice crystals in cirrus clouds.

Nimbus E Microwave Spectrometer (NEMS)
NEMS was to demonstrate the use of microwave sensors for measuring tropospheric temperature profiles, and water content in clouds, and surface temperature. The instrument monitored five selected frequencies continuously. The data were recorded on a magnetic tape so they could be transmitted later.

Electrically Scanning Microwave Radiometer (ESMR)

ESMR was used for mapping the microwave radiation from Earth's surface. This information was used to measure the water content of clouds, and to observe sea ice. It was also used to test the use of microwaves to measure soil moisture. The antenna system was deployed after launch, and controlled by an onboard computer.

Surface Composition Mapping Radiometer (SCMR) 
For measuring the thermal emission characteristics of earth's surface and sea temperatures. SCMR malfunctioned soon after launch.

Temperature/Humidity Infrared Radiometer (THIR)
THIR was for measuring cloud top temperatures and water vapor content in the stratosphere. It could measure cloud temperatures in the day and at night. The sensing unit was a bolometers made from germanium.

References 

Weather satellites of the United States
1972 in spaceflight